Pietro Santi Bartoli (also Sante or Santo; 1635 – 7 November 1700) was an Italian engraver, draughtsman, painter and antiquary.

Life and career

Bartoli was born at Perugia.

He moved to Rome in 1635 as a youth, there he studied painting under Jean Lemaire and Poussin, but abandoned it to devote himself entirely to engraving and as an antiquarian for Christina, Queen of Sweden. He engraved many Roman monuments, publishing in Admiranda Romanorum Antiquitatum (Rome, 1693). About 1660, he excavated the Domus Aurea, of which he published drawings.

As a draughtsman, Bartoli reproduced the Codice Virgiliano (Rome, Vatican, Bib. Apostolica, Cod. Vat. 3867) in 55 plates (1677; Rome, Calcografia N.), commissioned by Cardinal Camillo Massimo. For Massimo, he also did drawings of ancient Roman paintings and mosaics (Glasgow, U. Lib.). Later, he lived in Paris, where he was introduced at the court of Louis XIV. In 1699, with the engraver Domenico de' Rossi, he produced Romanae Magnitudinis Monumenta, a later edition of the 1637 Antiquae Urbis Splendor by Giacomo Lauro.  Bartoli adapted 138 of Lauro's original plates and engraved 16 new ones.

He died in Rome. His plates are chiefly etched.

Selected works
Among his works are: 
Admiranda Romanarum Antiquitatum ac veteris Sculptura vestigia; 81 plates.
Romanae magnitudinis Monumenta; 138 plates.
Veteres arcus Augustorum triumphis insignes; 52 plates.
Colonna di Marco Aurelio (Column of Marcus Aurelius); 78 plates.
Colonna traiana eretta dal Senato, e popolo romano all'imperatore Traiano (Trajan's Column) with Alfonso Ciacconi; (1673) 128 plates.
Pitture antiche di Roma, e del sepolcro de' Nasoni; (1702) 123 plates.
The Nozze Aldobrandini; (Roman 1st century Aldobrandini Wedding fresco) two sheets.
Le pitture antiche delle grotto di Roma; assisted by F. Bartoli; 94 plates, 1680 & 1706.
Veterum lucernae sepulcrales, collectae ex cavernis et specubus subterraneis, with Alexander Duke and Giovanni Pietro Bellori 1691 & 1704;  119 plates.
Scenes from the life of St. Peter; after Lanfranco.
Subjects from Raphael's Bible ; 42 plates.
Grottesques; after Raphael; inscribed Parerya atque ornamenta in Vaticano; 43 plates.
Antiquissimi Virgiliani Codicis fragmenta et picturae, ex Biblioteca Vaticano;
Birth of the Virgin; after Albani.
Virgin and Child in the Clouds; after Ludovico Carracci.
Coriolanus and his Family and San Carlo Borromeo led by an Angel; after Annibale Carracci.
Daniel in the Lions' Den; after Pietro da Cortona.
St. John preaching; after Mola.
Adoration of the Magi; after Raphael; in three sheets.
Jupiter nursed by Amalthea; Jupiter hurling thunderbolts at Giants; Hylas carried off by Nymphs; Sophonisba before Masinissa; Continence of Scipio; after Giulio Romano.
St. Stephen.
St. Bernard enchaining the Devil; Theatre erected in St. Peter's for a Canonization;
The sepulchral Monument of Pope Urban VIII.

References

 
 Mirco Modolo, Dal clivus Scauri al vicus Capitis Africae: gli affreschi della vigna Guglielmina a Roma nei disegni dei Bartoli, in Bollettino d'Arte, 8, Ottobre-dicembre 2010, pp. 1–20.

1615 births
1700 deaths
Italian draughtsmen
Italian engravers
17th-century Italian painters
Italian male painters
People from Perugia
Italian antiquarians
17th-century antiquarians